Gorgonidium is a genus of flowering plants in the family Araceae. It is native to South America (Peru, Bolivia, and Argentina). The spathes tend to be purple and the fruits are black.

Species
Gorgonidium beckianum Bogner - Bolivia
Gorgonidium bulbostylum Bogner & E.G.Gonç - Bolivia
Gorgonidium cardenasianum (Bogner) E.G.Gonç - Bolivia
Gorgonidium intermedium (Bogner) E.G.Gonç - Peru
Gorgonidium mirabile Schott - Bolivia
Gorgonidium striatum Hett., Ibisch & E.G.Gonç
Gorgonidium vargasii Bogner & Nicolson - Peru
Gorgonidium vermicidum (Speg.) Bogner & Nicolson - Bolivia, northern Argentina

References

Aroideae
Araceae genera
Flora of South America